The Paraguayan Rugby Union is the governing body for rugby union in Paraguay. It was founded in 1970 and became affiliated to the International Rugby Board in 1989.

Senior Paraguayan Rugby Championship

See also
Paraguay national rugby union team
Rugby union in Paraguay

External links
 IRB Paraguay page
 official union page
 Archives du Rugby: Paraguay

Rugby union in Paraguay
Paraguay
Sports governing bodies in Paraguay
Sports organizations established in 1970